Chapmannia sericea is a species of flowering plant in the family Fabaceae. It is found only in Yemen. Its natural habitat is rocky areas.

References

Dalbergieae
Endemic flora of Socotra
Near threatened plants
Taxonomy articles created by Polbot